Pete Swenson (born December 25, 1967) from Breckenridge, Colorado, is an American ski mountaineer and Competition Director of the United States Ski Mountaineering Association (USSMA).

Swanson attended the Colorado College until 1990.

Selected results 
 2006:
 9th, World Championship, relay, together with Cary Smith, Chris Kroger and Steve Romeo
 2009:
 1st, US Ski Mountaineering National Championship, Jackson Hole
 2010:
 2nd (seniors II), Patrouille des Glaciers, together with Benedikt Böhm and Javier Martín de Villa

References 

1967 births
Living people
American male ski mountaineers
Sportspeople from Colorado
People from Breckenridge, Colorado